Julian Tobias Emilio von Moos (born 1 April 2001) is a Swiss professional footballer who plays as a forward for St. Gallen. He was included in The Guardian's "Next Generation 2018".

Football career

Youth football 
Von Moos started his youth football with local club FC Romanshorn. In January 2013 he moved on to the youth movement of St. Gallen and for the season 2016–2017 he moved on again and joined the youth department of Grasshopper Club Zürich. While with the Grasshoppers he was called up by the youth national team and joined the Swiss U16 team.

Basel 
On 9 July 2018 FC Basel announced that they had signed a contract with von Moos dated up until June 2021. During their 2018–19 season, under head coach Marcel Koller, von Moos attended the trainings of their first team but played for their U-21 team. He played 20 games for them. After appearing in two test games with the first team, von Moos played his domestic league debut for his new club in the home game in the St. Jakob-Park on 25 May 2019 as Basel played against Xamax and he was substituted in after 74 minutes. He scored his first goal for his club in the same game, it was the last goal of the game as Basel won 4–1.

Also during their 2019–20 season von Moos attended the trainings of Basel's first team but played 13 games for their U-21 team up until Christmas. After playing in another four test games, von Moos was given another chance to play a league match. He was substituted in the away game against Young Boys on 26 January.

Wil 
On 7 February 2020 Basel announced that they were loaning von Moss out to FC Wil until the end of the 2019–20 season. Under head coach Ciriaco Sforza the Swiss U19 international would receive more match practice in the Challenge League, the second-highest tier of Swiss football. Von Moos played his first league game under Sforza for Wil on 15 February 2020 as they played a goalless draw with Schaffhausen. He scored his first goal for the club on 30 June in the away game against Grasshopper Club. The loan was successful for all three parties, Basel, Wil and the player himself. Von Moos played 13 games and scored seven goals during this period.

Return to Basel 
As the loan contract ran out von Moos returned to Basel. A few days later, on 26 August, the club announced that Ciriaco Sforza had been hired as the first team manager and he brought his assistant Daniel Hasler with him. Von Moos played his first game under Sforza for Basel on 20 September as Basel played a 2–2 draw with Vaduz.

Loan to Vitesse
In July 2021, he joined Vitesse in Eredivisie on a season-long loan, with an option to buy.

St. Gallen
On 3 January 2022, Von Moos joined St. Gallen for an undisclosed fee, signing a deal until the summer of 2024.

International career
Von Moos was born in Switzerland and is of Brazilian descent through his father, who was brazilian. He is a youth international for Switzerland.

Career statistics

Club

Notes

References

External links 

 Profile at Verein "Basler Fussballarchiv” online
 Profile at FCB Homepage
 Profile at SFL online
 Under-16 Profile at football.ch
 Under-17 Profile at football.ch
 Under-19 Profile at football.ch

2001 births
People from Arbon District
Living people
Swiss men's footballers
Switzerland youth international footballers
Swiss people of Brazilian descent
Association football forwards
FC St. Gallen players
Grasshopper Club Zürich players
FC Basel players
FC Wil players
SBV Vitesse players
Swiss Super League players
Swiss Challenge League players
Swiss expatriate footballers
Expatriate footballers in the Netherlands
Swiss expatriate sportspeople in the Netherlands
Sportspeople from Thurgau